Ternstroemia polypetala is a species of plant in the Pentaphylacaceae family. It is found in Cameroon, Malawi, and Tanzania. Its natural habitat is subtropical or tropical dry forests. It is threatened by habitat loss.

References

polypetala
Vulnerable plants
Taxonomy articles created by Polbot